Osceola Municipal Airport may refer to:

Osceola Municipal Airport (Arkansas) in Osceola, Arkansas, United States (FAA: 7M4)
Osceola Municipal Airport (Iowa) in Osceola, Iowa, United States (FAA: I75)
Osceola Municipal Airport (Missouri) in Osceola, Missouri, United States (FAA: 3MO)